This is a species list for the family Sphingidae of moths (Lepidoptera), commonly known as hawk-moths. This list contains all known species of Sphingidae in order of subfamily. There should be about 1,288 species listed. There are three subfamilies:
 Subfamily Macroglossinae
 Subfamily Smerinthinae
 Subfamily Sphinginae

The species list is given below.

Subfamily Macroglossinae

Genus Acosmerycoides
Acosmerycoides harterti

Genus Acosmeryx

Genus Aellopos

Genus Aleuron

Genus Ampelophaga

Genus Amphion
Amphion floridensis

Genus Angonyx

Genus Antinephele

Genus Atemnora
Atemnora westermannii

Genus Baniwa
Baniwa yavitensis

Genus Barbourion
Barbourion lemaii

Genus Basiothia

Genus Callionima

Genus Cautethia

Genus Cechenena

Genus Centroctena

Genus Cephonodes

Genus Chaerocina

Genus Cizara

Genus Clarina

Genus Dahira

Genus Daphnis

Genus Darapsa

Genus Deidamia
Deidamia inscriptum

Genus Deilephila

Genus Elibia

Genus Enpinanga

Genus Enyo

Genus Erinnyis

Genus Euchloron
Euchloron megaera

Genus Eumorpha

Genus Eupanacra

Genus Euproserpinus

Genus Eupyrrhoglossum

Genus Eurypteryx

Genus Giganteopalpus
Giganteopalpus mirabilis

Genus Gnathothlibus

Genus Griseosphinx

Genus Hayesiana

Genus Hemaris

Genus Hemeroplanes

Genus Himantoides
Himantoides undata

Genus Hippotion

Genus Hyles

Genus Hypaedalea

Genus Isognathus

Genus Kloneus
Kloneus babayaga

Genus Leucostrophus

Genus Maassenia

Genus Macroglossum

Genus Madoryx

Genus Micracosmeryx
Micracosmeryx chaochauensis

Genus Microsphinx
Microsphinx pumilum

Genus Neogurelca

Genus Nephele

Genus Nyceryx

Genus Odontosida

Genus Oryba

Genus Pachygonidia

Genus Pachylia

Genus Pachylioides
Pachylioides resumens

Genus Pergesa
Pergesa acteus

Genus Perigonia

Genus Phanoxyla
Phanoxyla hystrix

Genus Philodila
Philodila astyanor

Genus Phryxus
Phryxus caicus

Genus Proserpinus

Genus Protaleuron

Genus Pseudenyo
Pseudenyo benitensis

Genus Pseudoangonyx
Pseudoangonyx excellens

Genus Pseudosphinx
Pseudosphinx tetrio

Genus Rethera

Genus Rhagastis

Genus Rhodafra

Genus Sphecodina

Genus Sphingonaepiopsis

Genus Stolidoptera

Genus Temnora

Genus Temnoripais
Temnoripais lasti

Genus Theretra

Genus Tinostoma
Tinostoma smaragditis

Genus Unzela

Genus Xylophanes

Subfamily Smerinthinae

Genus Acanthosphinx
Acanthosphinx guessfeldti

Genus Adhemarius

Genus Afroclanis

Genus Afrosataspes
Afrosataspes galleyi

Genus Afrosphinx
Afrosphinx amabilis

Genus Agnosia

Genus Akbesia
Akbesia davidi

Genus Ambulyx

Genus Amorpha
Amorpha juglandis

Genus Amplypterus

Genus Anambulyx
Anambulyx elwesi

Genus Andriasa

Genus Avinoffia
Avinoffia hollandi

Genus Batocnema

Genus Cadiouclanis
Cadiouclanis bianchii

Genus Callambulyx

Genus Ceridia

Genus Chloroclanis
Chloroclanis virescens

Genus Clanidopsis
Clanidopsis exusta

Genus Clanis

Genus Coenotes

Genus Coequosa

Genus Compsulyx
Compsulyx cochereaui

Genus Craspedortha

Genus Cypa

Genus Cypoides

Genus Daphnusa

Genus Dargeclanis
Dargeclanis grandidieri

Genus Degmaptera

Genus Dolbina

Genus Falcatula

Genus Grillotius
Grillotius bergeri

Genus Gynoeryx

Genus Hopliocnema
Hopliocnema brachycera

Genus Imber
Imber tropicus

Genus Kentrochrysalis

Genus Langia

Genus Laothoe

Genus Larunda
Larunda molitor

Genus Leptoclanis
Leptoclanis pulchra

Genus Leucophlebia

Genus Likoma

Genus Lophostethus

Genus Lycosphingia
Lycosphingia hamatus

Genus Malgassoclanis

Genus Marumba

Genus Microclanis
Microclanis erlangeri

Genus Mimas

Genus Monarda
Monarda oryx

Genus Morwennius
Morwennius decoratus

Genus Neoclanis
Neoclanis basalis

Genus Neopolyptychus

Genus Opistoclanis
Opistoclanis hawkeri

Genus Oplerclanis
Oplerclanis boisduvali
Oplerclanis rhadamistus

Genus Orecta

Genus Pachysphinx

Genus Paonias

Genus Parum
Parum colligata

Genus Pentateucha

Genus Phyllosphingia
Phyllosphingia dissimilis

Genus Phylloxiphia

Genus Pierreclanis
Pierreclanis admatha

Genus Platysphinx

Genus Poliodes
Poliodes roseicornis

Genus Polyptychoides

Genus Polyptychopsis
Polyptychopsis marshalli

Genus Polyptychus

Genus Protambulyx

Genus Pseudandriasa
Pseudandriasa mutata

Genus Pseudoclanis

Genus Pseudopolyptychus
Pseudopolyptychus foliaceus

Genus Rhadinopasa
Rhadinopasa hornimani

Genus Rhodambulyx

Genus Rhodoprasina

Genus Rufoclanis

Genus Sataspes

Genus Smerinthulus

Genus Smerinthus

Genus Sphingulus
Sphingulus mus

Genus Synoecha
Synoecha marmorata

Genus Tetrachroa
Tetrachroa edwardsi

Genus Trogolegnum
Trogolegnum pseudambulyx

Genus Viriclanis
Viriclanis kingstoni

Genus Xenosphingia
Xenosphingia jansei

Subfamily Sphinginae

Genus Acherontia

Genus Adhemarius

Genus Agrius

Genus Amphimoea
Amphimoea walkeri

Genus Amphonyx

Genus Apocalypsis
Apocalypsis velox

Genus Callosphingia
Callosphingia circe

Genus Ceratomia

Genus Cocytius
Cocytius antaeus

Genus Coelonia

Genus Dolba
Dolba hyloeus

Genus Dolbogene
Dolbogene hartwegii

Genus Dovania

Genus Ellenbeckia
Ellenbeckia monospila

Genus Euryglottis

Genus Hoplistopus

Genus Isoparce

Genus Lapara

Genus Leucomonia
Leucomonia bethia

Genus Lintneria

Genus Litosphingia

Genus Lomocyma
Lomocyma oegrapha

Genus Macropoliana

Genus Manduca

Genus Megacorma

Genus Meganoton

Genus Morcocytius
Morcocytius mortuorum

Genus Nannoparce

Genus Neococytius
Neococytius cluentius

Genus Neogene

Genus Oligographa
Oligographa juniperi

Genus Panogena

Genus Pantophaea

Genus Paratrea
Paratrea plebeja

Genus Poliana

Genus Praedora

Genus Pseudococytius
Pseudococytius beelzebuth

Genus Pseudodolbina

Genus Psilogramma

Genus Sagenosoma
Sagenosoma elsa

Genus Sphingidites
Sphingidites weidneri

Genus Sphinx

Genus Thamnoecha
Thamnoecha uniformis

Genus Xanthopan
Xanthopan morganii

References 
Sphingidae of the World Checklist, All-Leps Barcode of Life

External links
 

 List
Sphingidae
Pandemis rectipenita